The Custom House, Lancaster is a grade II* listed building located on St Georges Quay, Lancaster, Lancashire, England.  The architect was Richard Gillow of the Gillow furniture making family.  Designed in 1764 for the Port Commissioners, it was used for its original purpose until 1882 when the Customs were transferred to Barrow-in-Furness.

Lancaster Maritime Museum 
The Custom House has housed the Lancaster Maritime Museum since 1985. Adjacent to the Custom House is a later bonded warehouse, which forms part of the Maritime Museum.

The museum's exhibits include local fishing vessels, ship models, area merchants and trade, including the slave trade, the Lancaster Canal, area fishing industry, the development of the local ports of Glasson, Heysham, Sunderland Point, and Morecambe, and the social and natural history of Morecambe Bay.

See also

Grade II* listed buildings in Lancashire
Listed buildings in Lancaster, Lancashire
Sandside, Beetham

References

External links
 Lancaster Maritime Museum
 Friends of the Lancaster Maritime Museum

Buildings and structures in Lancaster, Lancashire
Grade II* listed buildings in Lancashire
Houses completed in 1764
Lancaster
Maritime museums in England
Museums in Lancaster, Lancashire
Grade II* listed government buildings
Palladian architecture
1764 establishments in England